The Wappa Dam is a mass concrete gravity arch dam with earth-fill abutments and an un-gated spillway across the South Maroochy River that is located in the South East region of Queensland, Australia. The main purpose of the dam is for supply of potable water for the Sunshine Coast region. The impounded reservoir is also called Wappa Dam. The dam and most of the reservoir are within Kiamba with the most northerly part of the reservoir in Cooloolabin, both in the Sunshine Coast Region.

Location and features

The  dam wall holds back the  reservoir when at full capacity. Initially managed by the Sunshine Coast Regional Council, management of the dam was transferred to SEQ Water in July 2008 as part of a water security project in the South East Queensland region, known as the South East Queensland Water Grid. The accompanying water treatment plant is also managed by SEQ Water.

Recreational uses
Recreational use of the lake and its surrounding bushland reserve is severely limited, with prohibited recreational activities including swimming, water skiing, diving, mountain biking, horse riding, canoeing and kayaking, camping, and bushwalking. Picnic facilities are available at four locations around the dam, with access prohibited outside of daylight hours.

See also

List of dams in Queensland

References

External links 

South East Queensland
Reservoirs in Queensland
Dams in Queensland
Dams completed in 1963
Gravity dams
1963 establishments in Australia
Arch dams
Buildings and structures on the Sunshine Coast, Queensland